Musa Uzunlar (born 21 April 1959) is a Turkish actor. Uzunlar acted as Reşat in the Turkish TV series Fatmagül'ün Suçu Ne?. He played a lot of different roles in Turkish TV series and plays. He then portrayed the role of Bahri Umman in the TV series Poyraz Karayel.

Theatre 

 Yüzleşme
 Ful Yaprakaları
 Yaban
 Haydutlar
 Efrasyabın Hikayeleri
 Şerefe 20. Yüzyıl
 Urfaust

Filmography

TV series 
 Hayatımın Şansı - 2022–present - Turgay
 Bir Annenin Günahı - 2020 - Sadri
 8. Gün - 2018 - Hayati
 Poyraz Karayel - 2015–2017 - Bahri Umman
 Karanlıklar Çiçeği - 2012 - Tariyel Bey
 Şubat - 2012–2013 - Aziz Bey / Isaac Christian Novak
 Fatmagül'ün Suçu Ne? - 2010–2012 - Reşat Yaşaran
 Kurtlar Vadisi Pusu - 2008–2010 - İskender Büyük 
 Yağmur Zamanı - 2004–2006 -  Levent
 Merdoğlu - 2000
 Nilgün - 1999 - Sinan
 Ateş Dansı - 1998 - Sinan
 Süper Baba - 1993 - Sinan
 Bütün Kapılar Kapalıydı - 1990
 Geçmiş Bahar Mimozaları - 1989

Film 
 Doom of Love - 2022
 Poyraz Karayel: Küresel Sermaye - 2016 - Bahri Umman
 Cingöz Recai: Bir Efsanenin Dönüşü - Ghost
 Kurtlar Vadisi Gladio - 2009 - İskender Büyük
 Hayal Kurma Oyunları - 1999 - mother's boyfriend

References
 Musa Uzunlar - İskender Büyük

Turkish male film actors
Living people
1959 births
Turkish male television actors
Turkish male stage actors